Flash is a 1979 pinball game designed by Steve Ritchie and released by Williams. There is no connection between the game and the comics character.

Background
This was Steve Ritchie's first game for Williams after leaving Atari, after he was finished developing the Superman pinball for Atari. This game was known for having the first background sound for a pinball game, as well as the first pinball game to use flash lamps.

Steve Ritchie designed about 90% the game on a cocktail napkin during a flight, while flying from Atari to Williams. The game also broke the factory production record at Williams and is still Ritchie's biggest seller.

References

External links
The Internet Pinball Database entry for Flash

Williams pinball machines
1979 pinball machines